Anamarija Mišetić (born 4 June 1993) is a Croatian footballer who plays as a goalkeeper for Prva HNLŽ club ŽNK Split and the Croatia women's national team.

References

1993 births
Living people
Women's association football goalkeepers
Croatian women's footballers
Croatia women's international footballers
Croatian Women's First Football League players
ŽNK Split players